Sutherland McCoy "Cy" Bowen (February 17, 1871 – January 25, 1925) was a professional baseball player.  He was a right-handed pitcher for one season (1896) with the New York Giants.  In his career, he compiled a 0–1 record, with a 6.00 earned run average, and 3 strikeouts in 12 innings pitched.

External links

1871 births
1925 deaths
19th-century baseball players
New York Giants (NL) players
Major League Baseball pitchers
Baseball players from Indiana
Rochester Bronchos players
New Orleans Pelicans (baseball) players
Birmingham Barons players
Ilion Typewriters players
Albany Senators players
Wilkes-Barre Barons (baseball) players
Binghamton Bingoes players
Elmira Colonels players
Grand Rapids Raiders players
People from Decatur County, Indiana
People from Greensburg, Indiana